The Aluu Four lynching was a necklace lynching that involved students Ugonna Obuzor, Lloyd Toku, Chiadika Biringa, and Tekena Elkanah. They were all lynched after accused of theft in Aluu, a community in Obio/Akpor local government area, Rivers State, Nigeria on 5 October 2012.

Incident 
Chiadika Biringa, Lloyd Toku Mike, Tekena Elkanah and Ugonna Obuzor were all friends, first sons of their parents, and students of University of Port Harcourt. The four students were also occasional roommates. Ugonna sometimes spent the night with Tekena who lived outside the campus because his residence on campus was broken into multiple times. Ugonna had a debtor called Bright who owed him some undisclosed amount of money. Ugonna sought the help of his fellow rapper Lloyd, childhood friend Tekena and roommate Chiadika. Together they ventured to the house of the debtor around midnight carrying axe, pen knife, and Cutlass in order to scare the debtor. Allegedly, a misunderstanding ensued and eventually turned into a fight.

The debtor Bright started screaming, claiming that the men were there to steal laptops and mobile phones. A vigilante group from Aluu was alerted with the impression that the students were criminals disturbing the community. Before the vigilantes arrived, a mob started chasing the four men through the streets with sticks and stones. The students were caught, stripped naked, beaten and tortured until they were close to unconscious. In the presence of a crowd of Nigerian police officers and other citizens, they were dragged through mud, had concrete slabs dropped on their heads and car tires filled with petrol wrapped around their necks ("necklacing") in order to burn them. Nobody appeared able to stop this, including the Nigerian police force.

A sister of Tekena discovered that her brother and his friends were about to be killed via "jungle justice." She tried to intervene by screaming and reiterating their innocence but was overpowered by the size of the mob. People told her to flee. In a last attempt, she contacted family members and the police but the men had been killed by the time the assistance was sought. The murders were filmed with a mobile phone and uploaded on the internet.

Reactions 
The 3,5 minute video showing them "necklaced" on the ground, beaten multiple times and finally set on fire, went viral with most viewers condemning the crime. Condolences were sent to the families of the victims. The Senate condemned that members of the community carried out self-proclaimed justice without trial in the presence of a crowd. Students of the university protested the murders and rioted, destroying properties in the community where the students had been lynched.

Aftermath
The lynching became widely known in Nigeria and the world. The crime further exposed the "jungle justice" or mob justice in Nigeria. Several people were arrested for the crime.

On July 31, 2017, Rivers State High Court sentenced police sergeant Lucky Orji, David Chinasa Ogbada and Ikechukwu Louis Amadi (aka Kapoon) to death for their involvement in the murders of the four students.

The court also acquitted four of the suspects in the trial, Saviour Johnny, Abiodun Yusuf, Joshua Ekpe and Cyril Abang.

A film titled "Dark October" based on the lynching was released on Netflix in 4 February, 2023. It was directed by Toka Mcbaror and produced by Linda Ikeji.

References

2012 in Nigeria
2010s in Rivers State
Violence in Rivers State
October 2012 events in Nigeria
2012 murders in Nigeria
Filmed killings
Lynching deaths
Murdered students